Trailways of New York is one of the largest privately held transportation companies based in New York State. It employs over 450 people and carries passengers more than 80 million miles annually.

TrailwaysNY, as it is known, operates over 150 trips per day to more than 140 destinations in New York, New Jersey, and Canada. It is the largest and longest continuously operating intercity bus carrier in New York State, an interline partner with Megabus, and a member of the National Trailways Network.

History
Founded in 1926 by the Van Gonsic Berardi family, Trailways of New York first began as the Rip Van Winkle brand with commuter service between New York City and the Hudson Valley. During the 1930s, following a series of early successes in the then newly-emerging bus industry, service was first extended from its original Hudson Valley and Metro New York home into the Adirondacks.

Over time, Trailways of New York's holdings grew to include the Dixie Bus Center in New York City, the Pine Hill-Kingston Bus Corporation, and other properties.

Expansion came yet again in the 1990s, marking the companies' largest growth since the first half of the 20th century. During this time service was expanded to include Long Island and the nearby Canadian cities of Montreal, Quebec and Toronto, Ontario. A long term revenue sharing partnership was also established with Greyhound Bus Lines to provide enhanced service and reliability to the customers of both brands.

Affiliated with the Trailways Transportation System, Trailways of New York also offers connections with Academy Bus, Fullington Trailways, Greyhound Lines, Martz Trailways, Barons Bus Lines, Bieber Transportation Group, Short Line (bus company) (Coach USA), Lakefront Lines, and Peter Pan Bus Lines.

Trailways of New York once owned the Central Union Bus Terminal, also known as the Dixie Bus Center, which opened in April 1930 in what was then the Dixie Hotel in New York City. At the time, it was the largest enclosed bus station in New York. Buses entered next to the hotel’s entrance on West 43rd and proceeded underground, where they would rotate on a 35-foot turntable, then proceed into a designated berth. A waiting room for passengers was off to one side. Unable to compete with Port Authority Bus Terminal, which opened in 1950, the Hotel Dixie’s bus terminal closed in 1957. Today, the underground space is a parking garage and the hotel is now the Carter Hotel; the original turntable and waiting room floor are still visible.

Trailways of New York has been a chief “front of shirt” sponsor of the Kingston Stockade Football Club since its inception in 2015 and runs special “fan buses” to away games. The Kingston Stockade FC, a franchise in the National Premier Soccer League, plays its home games at Dietz Stadium in Kingston, NY and was founded by FourSquare CEO Dennis Crowley.

In 2019, an Adirondack Trailways bus crashed on Route 80 in Parsippany, New Jersey, killing one passenger and seriously injuring two.

In 2022, Trailways of New York ended its partnership with Greyhound and started one with Megabus.

Bus theft
In 2010, Darius McCollum was caught behind the wheel of a stolen Trailways NY bus en route to Kennedy Airport. McCollum is best known for his theft of "an E Train filled with passengers from 34th Street to The World Trade Center" when he was only 15 years old. This theft marked McCollum's 27th arrest for a transit related crime. For the theft, he was sentenced to 2 1/2 to 5 years in prison.

Brands

Trailways of New York operates under several brands: Adirondack Trailways, Pine Hill Trailways, New York Trailways, and LINE.

Adirondack Trailways
Adirondack Trailways is the brand used by Adirondack Transit Lines, Inc. The following routes are operated by Adirondack Trailways: New York-Kingston-Albany-Glens Falls-Montreal, Babylon-Kingston, Newburgh-Kingston, Kingston-Saugerties-Oneonta, Binghamton-Oneonta-Albany, Albany-Utica-Syracuse, Albany-Gloversville, Glens Falls-Warrensburg-Massena, and Syracuse-Canton-Massena.

Pine Hill Trailways
Pine Hill Trailways is the brand used by Pine Hill-Kingston Bus Corporation. The following route is operated by Pine Hill Trailways: New York-Kingston-Phoenicia-Oneonta-Utica.

New York Trailways
New York Trailways is the brand used by Passenger Bus Corporation. The following routes are operated by New York Trailways: New York-Binghamton-Syracuse-Rochester-Buffalo, Binghamton-Ithaca-Rochester, Binghamton-Elmira-Rochester, Elmira-Ithaca-Syracuse, and Syracuse-Canton-Massena. Many of these and other services had previously been operated by Western New York Motor Lines, Inc., which operated under the brand Empire Trailways, prior to their sale to Trailways of New York.

LINE 
In August 2018, Trailways of New York launched its brand LINE, a “business class” route running between midtown Manhattan, the Hudson Valley, and the Catskills. The service offers mobile ticketing, an on-board attendant, complimentary snacks and beverages, and a complimentary premium WiFi system that enables video and audio entertainment streaming. As of its launch, LINE stops included West 31st Street in Manhattan and the New York state towns of New Paltz, Kingston, Woodstock, Phoenicia, and Hunter.

Amtrak partnership 
In August 2018, Amtrak announced a partnership with Trailways of New York that will allow passengers, using one ticket, to connect from the railway stations at Rochester, Syracuse, Utica, and Saratoga Springs onto buses to upstate New York cities such as Cooperstown, Ithaca, Cortland, Glens Falls, Oneonta, and Lake George.

Ticket aggregator partnerships 
Trailways of New York has partnerships with the bus ticket aggregator services Wanderu and Busbud.

Fleet
Trailways of New York utilizes the following models in its fleet:
Motor Coach Industries  J4500, and D4505
Prevost H3-45
Van Hool C2045

In recent years, the MCI J4500 have been gradually retired in favor of new H3-45s.

Charter Operations and Seneca Niagara Casino Shuttle
In addition to the aforementioned line service Trailways offers, charter services are offered at both the Rochester and Kingston offices and bus service from Rochester New York to the Seneca Niagara Casino in Niagara Falls, New York via Rochester, Irondequoit, LeRoy, and Batavia are offered.

See also
Greyhound Lines, a competing and interline carrier throughout New York State
Short Line Bus, a competing and interline carrier in the Southern Tier region
Wanderu (company), a bus ticket search engine

References

External links
Trailways official website

Surface transportation in Greater New York
Transportation in New York (state)
Companies based in New York (state)
Transport companies established in 1926
Intercity bus companies of the United States
Bus transportation in New York (state)
1926 establishments in New York (state)
Transportation companies based in New York (state)
New York